Sfântu Gheorghe Solar Park is a large thin-film photovoltaic (PV) power system on a 4 ha plot of land near the Sfântu Gheorghe city in Romania.  The power plant is a 2.4-megawatt solar power system using state-of-the-art thin film technology, and was finished by the end of 2012. The solar park is expected to supply 1,000 MWh of electricity per year.

The installation will be in the Covasna County in central-eastern Romania. The investment cost for the Sfântu Gheorghe solar park amounts to some Euro 10 million.

See also 

 Energy policy of the European Union
 Photovoltaics
 Renewable energy commercialization
 Renewable energy in the European Union
 Solar power in Romania

References 

Photovoltaic power stations in Romania
Proposed solar power stations in Romania
Sfântu Gheorghe